Oleksii Krutykh (born 10 March 2000) is a Ukrainian tennis player.

Krutykh has a career high ATP singles ranking of World No. 160 achieved on 27 February 2023. He also has a career high doubles ranking of World No. 275 achieved on 5 December 2022. He is currently the No. 1 Ukrainian tennis player.

Krutykh has won 2 ATP Challenger singles titles and 2 doubles titles.

Career

2022: Two Challenger titles, top 200 debut
In August, Krutych won his first Challenger title at the 2022 IBG Prague Open defeating German Lucas Gerch and becoming the youngest Ukrainian champion on the Challenger Tour since Alexandr Dolgpolov won the Meknes Challenger in 2010 and the first Ukrainian to win a Challenger title in the season. He rose to a career-high No. 226 in 29 August 2022. 

He reached the top 200 in singles at world No. 190 climbing more than 60 positions up on 28 November 2022 after winning his second Challenger for the season and in his career in Valencia. At the same tournament he also won the doubles event climbing to a new career-high ranking of No. 276 in the top 300 in doubles.

2023: Grand Slam debut
In January, Krutych qualified for the 2023 Australian Open to make his Grand Slam debut.

Challenger and Futures/World Tennis Tour Finals

Singles: 9 (4–5)

Doubles

References

External links
 
 

2000 births
Living people
Ukrainian male tennis players
Sportspeople from Kyiv